Hank Marr (30 January 1927 – 16 March 2004) was a jazz musician known for his work on the Hammond B-3 organ.

Career
Natives of Columbus, Ohio, Hank Marr and tenor saxophonist Rusty Bryant co-led a group that toured for several years, beginning in 1958. Marr later led a group that featured James Blood Ulmer. Ulmer first recorded professionally with Marr in 1967–1968; they had previously toured in 1966–1967. Guitarists Freddie King (1961–1962) and Wilbert Longmire (1963–1964) also did recordings with Marr. In the late 1960s, Marr performed in a duo with guitarist Floyd Smith in Atlantic City, New Jersey.

Marr had two minor hit singles, "The Greasy Spoon" (U.S. No. 101, 1964) and "Silver Spoon" (U.S. No. 134, 1965).

Discography

Albums
 Teentime...Latest Dance Steps (King, 1963) -with Rusty Bryant, Cal Collins
 Live at the Club 502 (King, 1964) -with Rusty Bryant, Wilbert Longmire
 On and Off Stage (King, 1965) -with Rusty Bryant
 Sounds from the Marr-Ket Place (King, 1968) -with George Adams, James Blood Ulmer
 It's 'Bout Time! (Double Time, 1995)
 Groovin' It (Double Time, 1996)
 Hank & Frank (Double Time, 1997) -with Frank Foster
 Blues'n and Cruisin'  (Double Time, 2001 [2005])

Compilations
 Hank Marr Plays 24 Great Songs (King, 1966) 24 tracks/2LP compilation
 Greasy Spoon (King, 1969) 12 tracks/LP compilation
 Greasy Spoon (Charly R&B, 1991) 20 tracks/CD compilation

Singles
Federal Records
 1961 Tonk Game/Hob-Nobbin'
 1961 Ram-Bunk-Shush/The Push
 1961 Travelin' Heavy/Mexican Vodka
 1962 The Twist Serenade/Your Magic Touch
 1962 The Watusi-Roll/Sweet Nancy
 1963 Marsanova/Stand in Line
 1963 The Squash/Day By Day
 1963 The Push [reissue]/Tonk Game [reissue]
 1963 The Greasy Spoon/I Can't Go On (Without You)
 1964 I Remember New York/Easy Talk
 1964 Bridge to Shangri-La/Up and Down
 1965 Hank's Idea/Midnight Moon
 1965 Silver Spoon/No Rough Stuff

Wingate Records
 1966 Sonny Stitt: Stitt's Groove/Hank Marr: Marr's Groove
 1966 White House Party/The 'Out' Crowd

Federal Records
 1967 Philly Dog '67/I Remember New York [reissue]

King Records
 1968 Down in the Bottom/Soup Spoon
 1969 The Market Place/Smothered Soul
 1969 The Greasy Spoon [reissue]/All My Love Belongs to You

References

1927 births
2004 deaths
American jazz organists
American male organists
Hard bop organists
Soul-jazz organists
20th-century organists
20th-century American male musicians
American male jazz musicians
20th-century American keyboardists
Double-Time Records artists